Nana Kwadwo Jantuah (known as Samuel Kwadwo Jantuah, born 28 August 1985) is a Ghanaian Broadcast Journalist with Multimedia Group Limited. He is currently the host of Nhyira FM’s morning show in Kumasi. He is also the General Manager of Focus FM in the Kwame Nkrumah University of Science and Technology.

Life and career 
Nana Kwadwo Jantuah began his media career with Kwame Nkrumah University of Science and Technology campus based radio, Focus FM where he rose through the ranks as reporter, news anchor, producer and show host. He later worked as the morning show host at Shaft in Obuasi during school break while studying in Kwame Nkrumah University of Science and Technology before joining Light FM and Sunsum FM.

Education 
He attended Prempeh College for his secondary education and continued to obtain his first degree in Bachelor of Science in Building Technology from Kwame Nkrumah University (KNUST) of Science and Technology. Nana Kwadwo Jantuah then pursued Governance and Leadership at the Graduate School of Governance and Leadership (GSGL-Accra), 2012. In 2014 he graduated from KNUST with Commonwealth Executive Masters in Business Administration.

References 

Living people
Ghanaian radio journalists
Kwame Nkrumah University of Science and Technology alumni
Year of birth missing (living people)